Brassempouy is a commune in the Landes department in Nouvelle-Aquitaine in southwestern France.

The settlement is on the route between Mont-de-Marsan and Orthez.

Population

Prehistoric caves
The village became famous for its two nearby caves, and only 100 metres from each other, were among the first Paleolithic sites to be explored in France. They are known as the Galerie des Hyènes (Gallery of the Hyenas) and the Grotte du Pape (the "Pope's Cave"), in which the Venus of Brassempouy was discovered in 1892, accompanied by eight other human figures, often ignored, and an example of unfinished work, with multiple figures of women being carved at the same time. As a result, the four museums of history were established here.

See also
Communes of the Landes department

References

Communes of Landes (department)